Jukka Ikäläinen (born 14 May 1957 in Söderhamn, Sweden) is a retired football midfielder.

During his club career, Ikäläinen played for Kemin Into, Örgryte IS, GIF Sundsvall, Kiruna FF and Kemin Palloseura. He also played international football for the Finland national team.

He was the Finnish Football Association footballer of the year in 1985.

External links
 
 

1957 births
Living people
People from Söderhamn
Finnish footballers
Finnish expatriate footballers
Finland international footballers
Association football midfielders
GIF Sundsvall players
Örgryte IS players
Allsvenskan players
Expatriate footballers in Sweden
Finnish football managers
Finland national football team managers
Rovaniemen Palloseura managers
Vaasan Palloseura managers
Örgryte IS managers
Expatriate football managers in Sweden
Mestaruussarja players